Maksym Korotun (born March 1, 1985, in Kramatorsk, Donetsk Oblast) is a Ukrainian judoka, who competed for the extra-lightweight  category at the 2008 Summer Olympics in Beijing. He won a silver medal at the 2007 Summer Universiade in Bangkok, Thailand, losing out to South Korea's Cho Nam-Suk in the final match.

At the 2008 Summer Olympics, Korotun was eliminated in the first preliminary round of men's 60 kg class. He was defeated by Brazil's Denílson Lourenço, who scored an automatic ippon to end a match before the four-minute count.

References

External links
 
 NBC 2008 Olympics profile

1985 births
Living people
Ukrainian male judoka
Olympic judoka of Ukraine
Judoka at the 2008 Summer Olympics
People from Kramatorsk
Universiade medalists in judo
Universiade silver medalists for Ukraine
Medalists at the 2007 Summer Universiade
21st-century Ukrainian people